Aftermath is a 2014 South Korean web series starring Kim Dong-jun and based on Kim Sun-kwon's webtoon of the same title.

Plot
After a car accident, Dae-yong, a high school student, starts seeing people's eyes turn either into red or blue. Soon he realizes there's a pattern and that red eyes mean that person is going to die and blue eyes mean that person is going to kill someone and that he is now capable of saving people. Not only good things will come out of that as there's a cafe owner that has the same ability as him but is obsessed with murdering people and his relationships with his girlfriend Hee-kyung and best friend In-ho are at risk because of him having changed so much after becoming known as a hero.

Cast

Main
 Kim Dong-jun as Ahn Dae-yong
 Joo Yeon-woo as Kim Joon-goo
 Sun Joo-ah as Joo Hee-kyung

Supporting
 Kim Min-seok as Cho In-ho
 Kim Ri-ah as Kim Na-ri
 Ji Sun as Dae-yong's mom
 Chae Hee-jae as Hee-kyung's uncle
 Choi Kyu-hwan as homeroom teacher
 Lee Seung-yong as police officer
 Cha Soon-hyung

References

External links
 Aftermath at Naver TV (in Korean)
 Aftermath at Naver Blog (in Korean)
 

South Korean web series
2014 web series debuts
Naver TV original programming